John Conner (born 27 December 1896) was a Scottish footballer, who played as a forward.

Career
Born in Glasgow, Conner played professionally for Crystal Palace. He made 37 appearances for the club in the Southern League, scoring 18 goals, and when the club joined the Football League he made a further 61 appearances scoring 37 goals. He played across the front line, sometimes used as an inside right or inside left. He also appeared 6 times for the club in the FA Cup, netting on two occasions, for a total of 104 appearances and 57 goals. Conner's goals in the 1920-21 season lifted the club from the Third Division to the Second, and he finished top-scorer with 29 goals and was one of only four players to play every game of the season. Conner also scored the winning goal in the London Challenge Cup Final of that season, Palace beating Clapton Orient 1-0. At the end of the 1922-23 season Conner left the club for Newport County.

References

1896 births
Scottish footballers
Lisburn Distillery F.C. players
Newport County A.F.C. players
English Football League players
Southern Football League players
Crystal Palace F.C. players
Year of death missing
Association football forwards